Video Recordings Act may refer to:

Video Recordings Act 1984 in the United Kingdom
Video Recordings Act 1987 in New Zealand
Video Recordings Act 2010 in the United Kingdom